Dirk Hinderyckx (15 December 1956) is a former Belgian footballer who played mostly as attacking midfielder.

Honours

Player

Club Brugge 
 Belgian First Division: 1975-76, 1976-77
 Belgian Cup: 1976-77
 UEFA Cup: 1975-1976 (runners-up)

AA Gent 

 Belgian Second Division: 1979-80

References 

1956 births
Living people
Belgian footballers
Association football midfielders